Sønderjylland Elite Speedway or Southern Jutland Elite Speedway (also known as SES) is a speedway club from Vojens in Denmark, who compete in the Danish Speedway League.

History
A new team by the name of Sønderjylland Elite Speedway was created to race at the Vojens Speedway Center in 2020 and replaced the Vojens Speedway Klub. The latter still races age group events at the track.

The team won the Danish Speedway League title during the 2022 Danish speedway season.

Teams

2022 team

References 

Danish speedway teams